Akrumoni Coronation Institution also known as A. C. Institution is a higher secondary school situated at English Bazar of Malda district, West Bengal. The school  was established in 1912. It was called Middle English School when it was first established. The school also a boys hostel named ACI Hindu Hostel. The hostel premise got demolished due to infrastructural reasons. In 2018 A.C. Institution received the best Government High School Honour.

Notable alumni
 Nihar Ranjan Ghosh
 Krishnendu Narayan Choudhury

References

High schools and secondary schools in West Bengal
Schools in Malda district
Educational institutions established in 1912
1912 establishments in British India